The Sächsische Dampfschiffahrt of Dresden, Germany is the oldest and biggest paddle steamer fleet in the world. It consists of nine wheel steamers, two salon ships and two motor ships. It was formerly known as the White Fleet (Weisse Flotte in German).

All the ships have names of Saxon towns and cities or Saxon people like August the Strong. The ships connect Meißen via Dresden to Saxon Switzerland along the river Elbe where they pass some remarkable castles, vineyards and villa quarters.

External links

 Official website

Transport in Dresden
Tourist attractions in Dresden